In basketball, a free throw is an unopposed attempt to score points from behind the free throw line. The VTB United League's free throw percentage leader is the player with the highest free throw percentage in a given season.

To qualify as a leader for the free throw percentage, a player must play in at least 60 percent of the total number of possible games.

Nando de Colo is the only player in league history to lead the league in free throw percentage multiple times and also to lead the said statistics in consecutive seasons.

Free throw Percentage leaders

Notes

References

Basketball in Lithuania
Basketball in Russia
Free Throw